William Manley German (May 25, 1851 – March 31, 1933) was an Ontario barrister and political figure. He represented Welland in the Legislative Assembly of Ontario from 1894 to 1900 and in the House of Commons of Canada from 1891 to 1892, from 1900 to 1917 and from 1921 to 1925 as a Liberal member.

He was born in Hillier Township, Prince Edward County, Canada West, the son of George German whose parents were United Empire Loyalists from New York state. He studied at Victoria College in Cobourg. German articled in law with Lewis Wallbridge in Belleville and then Edward Fitzgerald in Toronto. He was called to the bar in 1883 and set up practice in Welland. In 1885, he married Henrietta Aylmer Macdonald. German was deputy reeve for Welland in 1890. He was elected to the House of Commons in 1891 but unseated after an appeal. German resigned his seat in the provincial assembly in 1900 to sit in the federal parliament. He ran unsuccessfully in 1917 and 1926 for the Welland seat in the House of Commons.

German introduced legislation in the House of Commons to establish a bridge commission which led to the construction of the Peace Bridge between Fort Erie, Ontario and Buffalo, New York; similar legislation had been introduced in the United States Congress and the New York State Legislature. He was vice-president of the Buffalo and Fort Erie Public Bridge Company established to build the bridge.

References

The Canadian parliamentary companion, 1891 JA Gemmill
Member's parliamentary history for the Legislative Assembly of Ontario
The History of the County of Welland, Ontario, its past and present (1887)

1851 births
1933 deaths
Ontario Liberal Party MPPs
Liberal Party of Canada MPs
Members of the House of Commons of Canada from Ontario
People from Prince Edward County, Ontario